is a 1983 Japanese film directed by Hideo Gosha.

Awards and nominations
Gosha won the Japanese Best Director Award in 1983 for his efforts. The film also received a number of other awards in Japan.

8th Hochi Film Award 
 Won: Best Supporting Actress - Mitsuko Baisho

References

External links

1983 films
Films directed by Hideo Gosha
1980s Japanese-language films
Films about geisha
1980s Japanese films